ORAC or Orac may refer to:

 Oxygen radical absorbance capacity, a scalar value derived in the laboratory for comparing the antioxidant content of different foods or nutritional supplements
 Office of the Registrar of Aboriginal Corporations, former name of the Australian government agency now called Office of the Registrar of Indigenous Corporations (ORIC)
 Orac, a fictional computer from the science fiction television series Blake's 7
 Orac (MD program), a classical molecular dynamics program for solvated biomolecules 
 Orac, Leova, a commune in Moldova
 Orac, an early poker-playing computer program developed by Mike Caro
 ORAC, Wilhelm Reich's abbreviation for his orgone accumulator

People
 Orac, pseudonym of David Gorski, cancer surgeon and blogger critical of alternative medicine
 Costel Orac (born 1959), Romanian footballer
 Daniel Orac (born 1985), Romanian footballer

See also
 Orak (disambiguation)